Bogucice is a district of Katowice, Poland.

Bogucice may also refer to the following places:
Bogucice, Lublin Voivodeship (east Poland)
Bogucice, Łódź Voivodeship (central Poland)
Bogucice, Bochnia County in Lesser Poland Voivodeship (south Poland)
Bogucice, Greater Poland Voivodeship (west-central Poland)
Bogucice, Lesser Poland Voivodeship (south Poland)